The 1924 International Cross Country Championships was held in Newcastle-on-Tyne, England, at Gosforth Park on 22 March 1924.  A report on the event was given in the Glasgow Herald.

Complete results, medallists, 
 and the results of British athletes were published.

Medallists

Individual Race Results

Men's (10 mi / 16.1 km)

Team Results

Men's

Participation
An unofficial count yields the participation of 52 athletes from 6 countries.

 (8)
 (9)
 (9)
 (9)
 (9)
 (8)

See also
 1924 in athletics (track and field)

References

International Cross Country Championships
International Cross Country Championships
Cross
International Cross Country Championships
International Cross Country Championships
Cross country running in the United Kingdom
Sport in Newcastle upon Tyne
20th century in Newcastle upon Tyne